Swift Air Limited was an airline based in Lilongwe, Malawi. It was a privately owned airline that operated regional passenger services. Its main base was at Kamuzu International Airport.

History
Swift Air was incorporated in September 2009, acquired flying licences in November 2010, and began operations on 28 February 2011. It concentrated on domestic flights between the business and mining hubs of the country, and performed a regular shuttle service to Johannesburg O. R. Tambo International Airport.

In May 2012 the airline ceased operations due to unpaid debts, believed to be in millions of kwacha.  All 24 employees of the company ceased reporting for work and the Head office in Lilongwe remained closed.

Fleet
Swift Air Malawi operated Douglas DC-9, Embraer 120 and Beechcraft 1900D aircraft until its closure in May 2012. All have either been returned to their respective owners or grounded as a result of the financial problems.

Destinations
Prior to its grounding, Swift Air operated domestically between Lilongwe, Blantyre, Mzuzu, Karonga with a single regional flight operated to Johannesburg, South Africa.

References

External links
 Swift Air fleet pictures at Flickr
 Swift Air – New Arrival at Air 'N There

Defunct airlines of Malawi
2011 establishments in Malawi
2012 disestablishments in Malawi
Airlines established in 2011
Airlines disestablished in 2012